Buzzle Township is a township in Beltrami County, Minnesota, United States. The population was 286 as of the 2000 census. Buzzle Township took its name from Buzzle Lake.

Geography

Unincorporated towns
 Aure at 
 Pinewood at 
(This list is based on USGS data and may include former settlements.)

Lakes
 Buzzle Lake
 Ess Lake (west edge)
 Funkley Lake
 Henson Lake
 Horseshow Lake
 Little Buzzle Lake
 Long Lake
 Spring Lake
 Tepee Lake
 White Fish Lake

Adjacent townships
 Roosevelt Township (north)
 Maple Ridge Township (northeast)
 Liberty Township (east)
 Eckles Township (southeast)
 Lammers Township (south)
 Shevlin Township, Clearwater County (southwest)
 Dudley Township, Clearwater County (west)

Cemeteries
The township contains these two cemeteries: Buzzle and Pinewood.

Demographics
As of the census of 2000, there were 286 people, 114 households, and 81 families residing in the township.  The population density was 8.2 people per square mile (3.2/km2).  There were 134 housing units at an average density of 3.8/sq mi (1.5/km2).  The racial makeup of the township was 98.95% White, 0.70% African American, and 0.35% from two or more races. Hispanic or Latino of any race were 0.35% of the population.

There were 114 households, out of which 26.3% had children under the age of 18 living with them, 64.0% were married couples living together, 3.5% had a female householder with no husband present, and 28.9% were non-families. 22.8% of all households were made up of individuals, and 9.6% had someone living alone who was 65 years of age or older.  The average household size was 2.51 and the average family size was 2.94.

In the township the population was spread out, with 21.7% under the age of 18, 9.8% from 18 to 24, 25.9% from 25 to 44, 28.3% from 45 to 64, and 14.3% who were 65 years of age or older.  The median age was 41 years. For every 100 females, there were 110.3 males.  For every 100 females age 18 and over, there were 105.5 males.

The median income for a household in the township was $25,000, and the median income for a family was $26,071. Males had a median income of $22,500 versus $22,143 for females. The per capita income for the township was $17,151.  About 21.3% of families and 25.7% of the population were below the poverty line, including 27.6% of those under the age of eighteen and 33.3% of those 65 or over.

References
 United States National Atlas
 United States Census Bureau 2007 TIGER/Line Shapefiles
 United States Board on Geographic Names (GNIS)

Townships in Beltrami County, Minnesota
Townships in Minnesota